= Zygodesmus fuscus =

Scientific classification
- Kingdom: Fungi
- Division: Basidiomycota
- Genus: Zygodesmus
- Species: Z. fuscus

Binomial name
- Zygodesmus fuscus Corda, 1840

Species of fungus

Zygodesmus fuscus is a species of fungus with unknown classification.

It is known two forms of the species:

- Zygodesmus fuscus f. fuscus
- Zygodesmus fuscus f. geogena Sacc.
